Personal identity is the unique numerical identity of persons through time.

Personal identity may also refer to:
 Identity (social science), an umbrella term used throughout the social sciences for an individual's comprehension of him or herself as a discrete, separate entity
 Personal identity number, as used by national authorities, or for identification for credit card usage and other situations
 Personally identifiable information, information that can be used to uniquely identify, contact, or locate a single person
 Right to personal identity, as recognised in international law
 Self-sovereign identity, an approach to digital identity that gives individuals control over the information they use to prove who they are

See also
 
 Identity (disambiguation)